Unkel is a Verbandsgemeinde ("collective municipality") in the district of Neuwied, in Rhineland-Palatinate, Germany. The seat of the Verbandsgemeinde is in Unkel.

The Verbandsgemeinde Unkel consists of the following Ortsgemeinden ("local municipalities"):

 Bruchhausen 
 Erpel
 Rheinbreitbach 
 Unkel

Verbandsgemeinde in Rhineland-Palatinate